Hainault Lodge in Fairlop is the only Local Nature Reserve in the London Borough of Redbridge. It is owned and managed by Redbrige Council.

History
The  site is a small remnant of the old Hainault Forest, named after a house which was built in 1851 and demolished in 1973. In 1986 the site was acquired by Redbridge Council. It was then so overgrown that it was inaccessible, and in 1990 volunteers started to manage it. In 1995 it was designated a Local Nature Reserve.

Ecology
The site is a mixture of pasture and woodland. Birds include long-tailed tits, robins, great spotted and green woodpeckers, and there are orange tip and speckled wood butterflies. Plants include butcher's broom, foxgloves and red campion. A disused boiler room has been converted into a bat hibernaculum.

Location
The reserve is at the corner of Forest Road and Romford Road, but the entrance gate in Forest Road is locked and there is no public access.

References

External links

Nature reserves in the London Borough of Redbridge
Local nature reserves in Greater London